The Brazoria National Wildlife Refuge is a  wildlife conservation area along the coast of Texas (USA), east of the towns of Angleton and Lake Jackson, Texas. It borders Christmas Bay and the Intracoastal Waterway, separated from the Gulf of Mexico by Follet's Island.

Brazoria National Wildlife Refuge was established in 1969 and provides quality habitat for wintering migratory waterfowl and other bird life. The refuge contains a freshwater slough which winds through salt marshes.

In winter, more than 100,000 snow geese, Canada geese, pintail, northern shoveler, teal, gadwall, American wigeon, mottled ducks, and sandhill cranes fill the numerous ponds and sloughs to capacity.

In summer, birds which nest on the refuge include 10 species of herons and egrets, white ibis, roseate spoonbill, mottled duck, white-tailed kite, clapper rail, horned lark, seaside sparrow, black skimmer, and scissor-tailed flycatcher.

Three national wildlife refuges on the Texas coast - Brazoria, San Bernard and Big Boggy - form a vital complex of coastal wetlands harboring more than 300 bird species.

Notes

References

External links

 Brazoria National Wildlife Refuge

National Wildlife Refuges in Texas
Protected areas of Brazoria County, Texas
Wetlands of Texas
Landforms of Brazoria County, Texas
Protected areas established in 1969
1969 establishments in Texas